Jeremy Summerly (born 28 February 1961) is a British conductor. He was educated at Lichfield Cathedral School, Winchester College, and New College, Oxford. While at Oxford he conducted the New College Chamber Orchestra and the Oxford Chamber Choir. After graduating with a first-class honours degree in music in 1982, he started work as a studio manager for BBC Radio, while pursuing postgraduate research in historical musicology at King's College London. Since 1991 he has been a presenter and reviewer for BBC's Radios 3 and 4, in particular for Radio 4's Front Row, and Radio 3's Record Review (formerly CD Review).

Since 1983 he has been conductor of the mixed-voice consort at the Edington Music Festival, and in 2012 he was appointed artistic director of Mayfield Festival of Music and the Arts, where he is also conductor of Mayfield Festival Choir.

He founded Oxford Camerata in 1984. In 1989, he was appointed lecturer at the Royal Academy of Music, where he was head of academic studies from 1996 to 2007, and thereafter head of continuing professional development. He was conductor of Schola Cantorum of Oxford from 1990 to 1996. He was made an Honorary Member of the Royal Academy of Music in 2006, and in 2015 he became their Sterndale Bennett Visiting Lecturer in Music.

In 2010, he was appointed director of music at St Luke's Church, Chelsea. He conducted the choir of The Queen's College, Oxford for the 2013–14 academic year, and was director of music at St Peter's College, Oxford, from 2015 to 2019. In 2017, he was made a Fellow of the Royal School of Church Music and he has been visiting professor of music history at Gresham College since 2019.

Discography

20th-century Sacred Music (Martin, Górecki, Duruflé, Stanford, Byron)
Schola Cantorum of Oxford  [Proudsound 129]

Lamentations (White, Tallis, Palestrina, Lassus, de Brito)
Oxford Camerata  [Naxos 8.550572]

Palestrina — Missae Papae Marcelli & Aeterna Christi munera
Oxford Camerata  [Naxos 8.550573]

Portuguese Requiem Masses (Lôbo, Cardoso)
Schola Cantorum of Oxford  [Naxos 8.550682]

Byrd — Masses for 4 and 5 Voices & Infelix ego
Oxford Camerata  [Naxos 8.550574]

Victoria — Missae O magnum mysterium & O quam gloriosum
Oxford Camerata  [Naxos 8.550575]

Tallis — Mass for Four Voices & Motets
Oxford Camerata  [Naxos 8.550576]

Gesualdo — Complete Sacred Music for 5 Voices
Oxford Camerata  [Naxos 8.550742]

Medieval Carols (Hildegard, Abelard, Planctus Guillelmus)
Oxford Camerata  [Naxos 8.550751]

20th-century Secular Music (Debussy, Ravel, Dallapiccola, Regner)
Schola Cantorum of Oxford  [Proudsound 130]

Allegri Miserere & Other Choral Masterpieces
Oxford Camerata  [Naxos 8.550827]

Lassus — Masses for 5 Voices & Infelix ego
Oxford Camerata  [Naxos 8.550842]

German Sacred Music (Bach, Mendelssohn, Wolf, Schoenberg)
Schola Cantorum of Oxford  [Proudsound 131]

Renaissance Masterpieces (Ockeghem, Lhéritier, Rogier etc.)
Oxford Camerata  [Naxos 8.550843]

Fauré — Requiem (1888 reconstruction) & Messe basse
Schola Cantorum of Oxford [Naxos 8.550765]

Bach — Magnificat BWV 243 & Cantata BWV 82
Northern Chamber Orchestra / Schola Cantorum of Oxford [Naxos 8.550763]

Vivaldi — Gloria RV 589 & Beatus vir RV 597
Northern Chamber Orchestra / Schola Cantorum of Oxford [Naxos 8.550767]

Palestrina / Lassus — Masses for 8 Voices & Stabat Mater
Schola Cantorum of Oxford  [Naxos 8.550836]

Tye — Missa Euge bone & Peccavimus cum patribus
Oxford Camerata  [Naxos 8.550937]

Purcell — Full Anthems & Organ Music
Oxford Camerata  [Naxos 8.553129]

Dufay — Missa L’homme armé
Oxford Camerata  [Naxos 8.553087]

Ockeghem — Missa L’homme armé
Oxford Camerata [Naxos 8.554297]

Josquin — Missa L’homme armé sexti toni
Oxford Camerata [Naxos 8.553428]

Hildegard — Heavenly Revelations
Oxford Camerata  [Naxos 8.550998]

Schütz — Psalmen Davids
Oxford Camerata  [Naxos 8.553044]

English Madrigals & Songs
Oxford Camerata  [Naxos 8.553088]

Gibbons — Choral & Organ Music
Oxford Camerata  [Naxos 8.553130]

Weelkes — Anthems
Oxford Camerata  [Naxos 8.553209]

Schütz — The Christmas Story
Oxford Camerata  [Naxos 8.553514]

Machaut — Messe de Nostre Dame & Le Voir Dit
Oxford Camerata  [Naxos 8.553833]

Obrecht — Missa Caput
Oxford Camerata [Naxos 8.553210]

Willaert — Missa Christus resurgens
Oxford Camerata [Naxos 8.553211]

Piæ Cantiones (1582)
Oxford Camerata [Naxos 8.553578]

Duruflé Requiem & Howells Motets
Schola Cantorum of Oxford [Manor MLR 0170]

Tomkins — Choral & Organ Music
Oxford Camerata [Naxos 8.553794]

Handel — Coronation Anthems & Silete venti
Tallis Chamber Choir / Royal Academy Consort [Naxos 8.557003]

John Streeting — Sacred music
Choir of Christ Church, Chelsea [Manor MLR 0209]

Gombert — Motets
Oxford Camerata [Naxos 8.557732]

Mozart — Requiem
Members of BBCSO, LPO, LSO, RPO, GFO etc. [Hyperion DEC FK1]

Tallis — Spem in alium, Missa Salve intemerata
Oxford Camerata [Naxos 8.557770]

Tavener — Lament for Jerusalem (Jerusalem version)
Choir of London & Orchestra [Naxos 8.557826]

Hildegard — Celestial Harmonies
Oxford Camerata [Naxos 8.557983]

Children of our Time (Tippett, Rodrigues, Pott, Byrchmore, O’Neill, Pitts)
Schola Cantorum of Oxford [Hyperion CDA 67575]

Schumann — Partsongs
Oxford Camerata / Graham Johnson [Hyperion CDJ 33110]

Publications

Gaudete – Medieval Songs and Carols (Faber Music, 1999)

Passetime with Good Company – Medieval Songs and Carols (Faber Music, 2000)

Fair Oriana – Madrigals in Celebration of Elizabeth I (Faber Music, 2002)

Thomas Tallis – English Sacred Music (Faber Music, 2004)

‘Vocal Performance before c.1430’ Cambridge History of Musical Performance (CUP, 2013)

‘Choir’ Cambridge Encyclopedia of Historical Performance in Music (CUP, 2018)

‘Guido d’Arezzo’ Cambridge Encyclopedia of Historical Performance in Music (CUP, 2018)

References

External links
oxfordcamerata.com
https://www.naxos.com/person/Jeremy_Summerly
gresham.ac.uk/professors-and-speakers
twitter.com/jsummerly
St Luke's Choir Chelsea SW3 - YouTube
https://www.jeremysummerly.com

1961 births
Living people
People educated at Winchester College
Alumni of New College, Oxford
Alumni of King's College London
20th-century British conductors (music)
British male conductors (music)
Academics of the Royal Academy of Music
Honorary Members of the Royal Academy of Music
21st-century British conductors (music)
21st-century British male musicians
20th-century British male musicians
Choral Scholars of New College, Oxford